Zwolle is a hamlet in the province of Gelderland, Netherlands. It is located in the municipality of Oost Gelre, about 3 km southeast of the town of Groenlo.

It was first mentioned in 1234 as Suellen and means "height". The postal authorities have placed it under Groenlo. In 1840, Zwolle was home to 245 people. It has its own place name signs.

References

Populated places in Gelderland
Oost Gelre